G. intermedia  may refer to:
 Galathea intermedia, a squat lobster species found in the north-eastern Atlantic Ocean
 Gallotia intermedia, the Tenerife speckled lizard or lagarto canario moteado, a recently discovered wall lizard species of Tenerife in the Canary Islands
 Garcinia intermedia, a tropical American fruit tree species
 Geranomyia intermedia, a crane fly species in the genus Geranomyia
 Gila intermedia, the Gila chub, a fish species found in Mexico and the United States

See also
 Intermedia (disambiguation)